Soldatskoye is a rural locality (a selo) and the administrative center of Petrenkovskoye Rural Settlement, Ostrogozhsky District, Voronezh Oblast, Russia. The population was 543 as of 2010. There are 22 streets.

Geography 
Soldatskoye is located on the left bank of the Potudan River, 24 km north of Ostrogozhsk (the district's administrative centre) by road. Prilepy is the nearest rural locality.

References 

Rural localities in Ostrogozhsky District